Big Brown may refer to:
 Big Brown (horse), an American thoroughbred racehorse
 Big brown bat, an North American bat
 Big Brown, a nickname for the delivery company United Parcel Service
 Big Brown Box, an Australian online retailer
Big Brown (poet) (1920–1980), American street performer
 Big Brown, a nickname of retired UFC fighter Brendan Schaub
Big Brown Power Plant, a former power plant in Texas

See also